Salome Mulugeta is an Ethiopian and Eritrean-American filmmaker, actor and journalist educated in England. She is the recipient of the  Ambassador Award 2019 and a Mayor Muriel Bowser proclamation honoree. Salome is best known for her first feature film, Woven, and for winning the Audience Narrative Award for Film Directed by Women of Color at the African Diaspora International Film Festival in New York. Mulugeta and Nagwa Ibrahim co-directed Woven which premiered at the Los Angeles Film Festival.

Background
Salome Mulugeta was born in Addis Ababa, Ethiopia. She  attended Clarendon School for Girls in Bedfordshire, England, before studying broadcasting and journalism at MidAmerica Nazarene University, a private Christian university in Olathe, Kansas. Salome worked at a local TV station in Kansas before moving to Los Angeles, where she co-wrote Woven with actor Ryan Spahn. After meeting Nagwa Ibrahim, the pair directed and produced Woven together. The film, in which Mulugeta also starred, debuted its New York premiere at the 2017 African Diaspora Film Festival in New York,<ref>Woven: Film by Salome Mulugeta Makes NY Premiere at ADIFF 2017, Tadias Magazine, November 17, 2017.</ref> and screened its world premiere at the 2016 Los Angeles Film Festival.

FilmographyWoven (''2018)
Abeka (In Development)
A Lit Light Bulb (2018)
Marz (2016)
He's Way More Famous Than You (2013)
Baby of the Family (2002)

References

Year of birth missing (living people)
People educated at Clarendon School for Girls
Living people
American film directors
American film producers
American women film directors
American women film producers
Ethiopian film directors
Ethiopian women film directors
21st-century American women